The men's light bantamweight (51 kg/112.2 lbs) Full-Contact category at the W.A.K.O. World Championships 2007 in Coimbra was the lightest of the male Full-Contact tournaments, involving eleven fighters from two continents (Europe and Asia).  Each of the matches was three rounds of two minutes each and were fought under Full-Contact rules.   

Due to there being too few fighters for a sixteen-man tournament, five of the fighters had a bye through to the quarter final.  The tournament winner was the Italian Ivan Sciolla who defeated Azerbaijani Zaur Mammadov by split decision to claim gold in what was a rematch of the Low-Kick final in Belgrade (Mammadov had won the gold that time).  The bronze medal positions were taken by Spain's Joaquín Céspedes Salas and Russia's Ivan Bityutskikh.

Results

Key

See also
List of WAKO Amateur World Championships
List of WAKO Amateur European Championships
List of male kickboxers

References

External links
 WAKO World Association of Kickboxing Organizations Official Site

Kickboxing events at the WAKO World Championships 2007 Coimbra
2007 in kickboxing
Kickboxing in Portugal